The men's decathlon at the 2007 All-Africa Games was held on July 18–19.

Results

References
Results

Decathlon